James Graham Leslie (14 November 1868 – 16 May 1949) was a unionist politician in Northern Ireland.

He was born the son of Seymour and Louisa (née Graham) Leslie. His father worked in the Probate Office, London. He inherited the family seat at Leslie Hill, Ballymoney, County Antrim from his uncle. He was appointed High Sheriff of Antrim in 1907.

Leslie studied at Gray's Inn and briefly went into the law, before joining the Contract Department of the British Foreign Office.  In 1907, he served as High Sheriff of Antrim.  He resigned when given control of his family estates, and sat as an Irish Unionist Party councillor in County Antrim.  In 1921, he was elected for the Ulster Unionist Party to the first Senate of Northern Ireland, and served until his death in 1949.  Given his experience in drafting, he played a key role in maintaining the chamber as an institution capable of revising bills from the lower chamber.

From 1945 to 1949, Leslie served as the Lord Lieutenant of Antrim.

He married in 1901 Grace, the daughter of J. Lament Brodie of Wimbledon, with whom he had a son, Seymour, and two daughters.

References

External links
 

1868 births
1949 deaths
Councillors in County Antrim
High Sheriffs of Antrim
Lord-Lieutenants of Antrim
Members of Gray's Inn
Members of the Privy Council of Northern Ireland
Members of the Senate of Northern Ireland 1921–1925
Members of the Senate of Northern Ireland 1925–1929
Members of the Senate of Northern Ireland 1929–1933
Members of the Senate of Northern Ireland 1933–1937
Members of the Senate of Northern Ireland 1937–1941
Members of the Senate of Northern Ireland 1941–1945
Members of the Senate of Northern Ireland 1945–1949
Ulster Unionist Party members of the Senate of Northern Ireland